Fort Simpson Airport  is located  east southeast of Fort Simpson, Northwest Territories, Canada.

Airlines and destinations

Accidents and incidents
On 26 June 1994, Douglas C-47A C-FROD of Buffalo Airways crashed on approach due to fuel exhaustion. The aircraft was on a cargo flight from Trout Lake Airport. There were two crews on board at that time. There were no fatalities but the aircraft was written off.

See also
 List of airports in the Fort Simpson area

References

External links

Certified airports in the Dehcho Region